The Frankfurt Galaxy were a professional American football team that originally played in the World League of American Football and later in the resurrected NFL Europe. The team was based in Frankfurt, Germany and played in the Commerzbank-Arena, formerly called Waldstadion. The Galaxy was the only team in the league to have remained in operation and in the same city throughout the league's existence.

As of 2021, an unrelated team of the same name plays in the European League of Football.

History
In 1991, the Galaxy was a founding member of the World League of American Football (WLAF). They hosted the first ever WLAF game against the London Monarchs at the Waldstadion on March 23, 1991, and scored the first ever WLAF points with a safety, but lost the game.

When the World League resumed in 1995, the Galaxy, the Monarchs, and Barcelona Dragons were the only former WLAF teams that continued playing. Before it folded, Frankfurt Galaxy was the oldest pro football team outside of the NFL and CFL. Frankfurt also played in the last NFL Europa game, losing the 2007 World Bowl to Hamburg.

The Frankfurt Galaxy's record eight appearances in the 15 World Bowl games were evenly split in the composite standings with four wins (1995, 1999, 2003 and 2006) and four losses (1996, 1998, 2004, and 2007).

Season-by-season

Head coaches

Notable players

References

External links
 The Football Database

 
American football in Hesse
NFL Europe (WLAF) teams
Galaxy
Defunct American football teams in Germany
American football teams established in 1991
American football teams disestablished in 2007
1991 establishments in Germany
2007 disestablishments in Germany